Material efficiency is a description or metric (Mp) (the ratio of material used to the supplied material) which refers to decreasing the amount of a particular material needed to produce a specific product.  Making a usable item out of thinner stock than a prior version increases the material efficiency of the manufacturing process. Material efficiency goes hand in hand with Green building and Energy conservation, as well as other ways of incorporating Renewable resources in the building process from start to finish.

The motivations for material efficiency include reducing energy demand, reducing Greenhouse gas emissions, and other environmental impacts such as land use, water scarcity, air pollution, water pollution, and waste management. With a growing population and increasing wealth, demand for material extraction and processing will likely to double in the next 40 years. The environmental impacts of the required processing will become critical in the transition to a sustainable future.

Material efficiency aims to reduce the impacts associated with material consumption. Some technical strategies include increasing the life of existing products, using them more in entirety, re-using components to avoid waste, or reducing the amount of material through a lightweight product design. For example, making a usable item out of thinner stock than a prior version increases the material efficiency of the manufacturing process. Increasing material efficiency is a crucial opportunity to achieve the 1.5 °C goal by the Paris agreement.

Manufacturing 

Material efficiency in manufacturing refers to reduce the amount of raw materials used for manufacturing a product, generating less waste per product, and improving waste management. Generally using building materials such as steel, reinforced concrete, and aluminum release CO2 during production. In 2015, materials manufacturing for building construction were responsible for 11% of global energy-related CO2 emissions. The largest market for aluminum is the transportation sector, which produces vehicles, airplanes, railways, and subway cars; other applications include building, construction, and packaging.

The potential in manufacturing can be related to improving waste segregation (e.g., separating plastics from combustibles). Recycling and reusing components allow for remanufacturing during the process improvement in creating the product, increasing the material's life for durability, technology development, and correct component/material purchasing. Material efficiency contributes to achieving a circular economy and capturing value in the industry. Many companies have applied the theory of circular economy to design strategies and business models to close material loops.

Building process 
Since 1971, global steel demand has increased by three times, cement by nearly seven times, primary aluminum by almost six times, and plastics by over ten times. Significant materials, such as iron and steel, aluminum, cement, chemical products, and pulp and paper, impact the building process. However, employing more efficient strategies to produce these materials will reduce energy and cost without ignoring the reduction of carbon emissions. An example of this would be using recycled steel to erect the frame of a building instead of using wooden timbers. Using recycled steel saves room in landfills that the steel would otherwise be taking up, saves 75% of the energy required to produce steel in the production process, and saves trees from being cut down to build homes. The recycled steel can be fashioned in the exact dimensions needed for building and can be made into "customized steel beams and panels to fit each specific design."

Strategies 

During the manufacturing process, each stage has new opportunities to increase material efficiency, from design and fabrication, through use, and finally to the end of life.

Some strategies are:

 Reduction: Innovating and optimizing strategies may reduce the use of material while providing the same service. In addition, designing for durability could result in a resilient material. Modular design can facilitate material efficiency by reusing components and minimizing components needed in the production process.
 Durability: Extending product life through redesign or repair. More intensive use and extending product or buildings lifetimes through repair and refurbishment can reduce the need for materials to produce new products.
 Lightweight products: The reduction of material use for a service; Some examples are: Universal beams, food cans, reinforcing bars, commercial steel-framed buildings.
 Reuse: The main purpose is re use components for remanufacturing/refurbishing. Reusing current materials uses even less energy than recycling.

Recycling 

Recycling can enable lower-emission second purpose to new materials like steel, aluminum and other metals. Incorporating recycled materials into the manufacturing process of new goods is a necessary change. Recycling is common for most materials these days, is found in every country and economy. Some materials that can be recycle are:
 Aluminum

Aluminum offers the most savings, with cans from recycled material requiring as little as 4% of the energy required to make the same cans from bauxite ore. Metals don't degrade as they're recycled in the same way plastics and paper do, fibers shortening every cycle, so many metals are prime candidates for recycling, especially considering their high value per ton compared to other recyclables. Aluminum is a highly desirable metal for recycling because it retains the same properties and quality, no matter how many times the aluminum can be recycled. After all, once it's melted, the structure doesn't change.

 Plastics

According to World Economic Forum approximately 36% of all plastic produced is used to create packaging, 85% of which ends up in landfills. Plastic waste is a mixture of different types of plastics, and it isn't easy to recycle. Plastic recycling has several challenges. Plastic cannot be recycled several times without quickly degrading in quality; The total bottle recycling rate for 2020 was 27.2%, down from 28.7% in 2019. Every hour, 2.5 million plastic bottles are thrown away in the U.S. Currently, around 75 and 199 million tons of plastic are in our oceans, without considering microplastics. 
 Paper
Paper (in particular newspaper) have lower energy savings than the previous materials, with recycled products costing 45% and 21% less energy respectively. Recycled paper has a large market in China, although work still needs to be done to facilitate mixed paper recycling as opposed to newspaper. Utilizing these recycling methods would permit spending less energy and resources on extracting new resources to use in manufacturing. Despite significant progress in recycling over the last decades, the paper sector is a substantial contributor to global greenhouse gas emissions. The pulp and paper industries produce 50% of their own energy from biomass, which still requires huge amounts of energy.

Policy 

Public policies help to discuss and provide a market incentive for more efficient use of materials. There are severe impediments to material efficiency improvement, including hesitation to invest, a lack of available and accessible information, and economic disincentives. However, a wide range of policy strategies and innovations have been created in some countries to achieve the mentioned goals. These include regulation and guidelines; economic incentives; voluntary agreements and actions; information, education, and training; and funding for research, development, and demonstration.

In 2022, United States released the program "The Critical Material Innovation, Efficiency, And Alternatives". It will be to study, develop, demonstrate and trade with the primary goal of creating new alternatives to critical material, promoting efficient manufacturing and use. In addition, The U.S. Department of Energy released a new "Energy Efficiency Materials Pilot Program for Nonprofits" program to provide nonprofit organizations with funding to upgrade building materials to improve energy efficiency, lower utility costs, and reduce carbon emissions.

See also 

 Circular economy
 Conservation ethic
 Conservation movement
 Ecological deficit
 Energy conservation
 Environmental protection
 Renewable energy
 Sustainable architecture

References

Sustainable building
Building engineering